Parinacota (in hispanicized spelling), Parina Quta or Parinaquta (Aymara, parina flamingo, quta lake, "flamingo lake", other hispanicized spellings Parinaccota, Parinajota) may refer to:

Lakes 
 Parinaquta (Carabaya), in Peru, Puno Region, Carabaya Province
 Parinaquta (Chucuito), in Peru, Puno Region, Chucuito Province
 Parina Quta (Oruro), in Bolivia, Oruro Department
 Parina Quta (Bolivia-Peru), in Bolivia, La Paz Department and in Peru, Puno Region, El Collao Province

Volcanoes 
Parinacota Volcano

Places 
Parinacota Province
Parinacota, Chile
Arica-Parinacota Region